Mali Dubovik is a village in Krupa na Uni, Republika Srpska, Bosnia and Herzegovina.

History
Prior to the Bosnian War, the village was part of the municipality of Bosanska Krupa, which today is part of the Una-Sana Canton Federation of Bosnia and Herzegovina.

Demographics 
In the census of 1991, it had 300 inhabitants, a majority of residents being ethnic Serbs. According to the 2013 census, its population was 175, all Serbs.

Demographic history

References

Populated places in Krupa na Uni